Manchester is a city in Northwest England.  The M8 postcode area is to the north of the city centre, and contains the districts of Cheetham Hill and Crumpsall.  This postcode area contains 20 listed buildings that are recorded in the National Heritage List for England.  Of these, two are listed at Grade II*, the middle of the three grades, and the others are at Grade II, the lowest grade.  The area is residential, and the listed buildings include churches and associated structures, houses, former civic buildings, two museums, a bandstand, a park shelter, a former billiard hall, and a war memorial.


Key

Buildings

References

Citations

Sources

Lists of listed buildings in Greater Manchester
Buildings and structures in Manchester